Hazas de Cesto is a municipality located in the autonomous community of Cantabria, Spain. According to the 2007 census, the city has a population of 1,285 inhabitants. Its capital is Beranga.

References

External links
Hazas de Cesto - Cantabria 102 Municipios
Beranga´s Web - Beranga's Web

Municipalities in Cantabria